Khathekhola Rural Municipality (Khathekhola Gaupalika) (Nepali: काठेखोला गाउँपालिका) is a Gaunpalika in Baglung District in Gandaki Province of Nepal. On 12 March 2017, the government of Nepal implemented a new local administrative structure, in which VDCs have been replaced with municipal and Village Councils. Kathekhola is one of these 753 local units.

References 

Baglung District
Rural municipalities of Nepal established in 2017
Rural municipalities in Baglung District